Silent Hill is a psychological horror film series, based on the video game series of the same name by Konami.

Proposed by Christophe Gans, and adapted from the video game Silent Hill (1999), the film series began with the release of Silent Hill (2006). The film was followed by a sequel, Silent Hill: Revelation (2012). In 2022, a third film titled Return to Silent Hill was officially announced, which will adapt the video game Silent Hill 2 (2001).

The series has grossed $156 million at the box office worldwide and has received generally negative reviews from critics.

Films

Silent Hill (2006)

During the filming of Brotherhood of the Wolf, director Christophe Gans first proposed the idea of directing of a Silent Hill film to producer Samuel Hadida, who reacted positively to the news. Several years later, Gans was awarded the rights to a film adaptation from Konami, having competed against Paramount Pictures, Sam Raimi, and Cruise/Wagner Productions, after he demonstrated his personal knowledge of the video game series. Gans initially wished to adapt the second game in the series, but later decided against it, as it would prove "impossible to tell that story" without explanation, "So we decided to go back to the first one, because in the first game, we have the explanation of why Silent Hill became that strange zone."

Gans and Roger Avary then began working on the film's screenplay in 2004, and began principal photography in 2005. Radha Mitchell, Sean Bean, Laurie Holden, Jodelle Ferland, Deborah Kara Unger, and Alice Krige, among others, were cast into the film. Bean's character did not appear in the initial screenplay and was added by Gans later, due to the producer's concerns over a lack of male characters. The film was shot in Ontario, Canada, as well as sound stages, and was released to theaters in the U.S. on April 21, 2006.

Silent Hill: Revelation (2012)

Following Gans' departure with the project in 2007, Lionsgate brought on director M. J. Bassett in 2010, and announced the title as Silent Hill: Revelation 3D. The film featured several returning characters from its predecessor, and serves as a direct sequel to the first film, rather than as an adaptation of another game. However, the film does feature elements from the 2003 video game Silent Hill 3, such as the inclusion of character Heather Mason.

Silent Hill: Revelation was released theatrically in Canada on October 26, 2012.

Return to Silent Hill (TBA)
In October 2012, Bassett stated that if a sequel to Revelation was made, it would adapt stories from the graphic novels, rather than the video games.

In January 2020, Christophe Gans stated during an interview that he was working on a new film in the series with Victor Hadida. In June 2022, Gans stated that he was working on the film and expected it to be released in 2023.

On October 19, 2022, Konami officially announced that a new film was in development, titled Return to Silent Hill, with Gans returning to direct and Victor Hadida serving as a producer. The film will be based on the 2001 video game Silent Hill 2 and will feature the return of Pyramid Head. It will be written by Gans, Sandra Vo-Ahn, and Will Schneider. In February 2023, Deadline reported that Return to Silent Hill had secured funding and would begin filming soon. In March 2023, Deadline also reported that Jeremy Irvine and Hannah Emily Anderson were cast in the film's lead roles, with filming set to begin in April.

Recurring cast and characters

Reception

Box office performance

Critical and public response

Home media

Notes

References 

Film series introduced in 2006
Horror film series
Silent Hill